Hussey Tower is a historic tower, dating to , located in Boston, Lincolnshire, England. It is a grade II* listed building. It was commissioned by Richard Benyngton, collector of taxes and Justice of the Peace for Boston.

References

Grade II* listed buildings in Lincolnshire
Towers in Lincolnshire
Towers completed in the 15th century
Buildings and structures in Boston, Lincolnshire